The Chinese character description languages are several proposed languages to most accurately and completely describe Chinese (or CJK) characters and information such as their list of components, list of strokes (basic and complex), their order, and the location of each of them on a background empty square.  They are designed to overcome the inherent lack of information within a bitmap description.  This enriched information can be used to identify variants of characters that are unified into one code point by Unicode and ISO/IEC 10646, as well as to provide an alternative form of representation for rare characters that do not yet have a standardized encoding in Unicode or ISO/IEC 10646. Many aim to work for Kaishu style and Song style, as well as to provide the character's internal structure which can be used for easier look-up of a character by indexing the character's internal make-up and cross-referencing among similar characters.

CDL

Character Description Language is a font technology, based on XML, co-created by Tom Bishop and Richard Cook for Wenlin Institute, Inc, designed for describing any CJK character, but suitable for describing any glyph.

This XML-based declarative language defines the stroke order of each component (a subunit of the glyph similar to a radical, but not necessarily bearing the semantic significance of a true radical), as well as assembly of previously defined components to build up ever more complex characters.  Many of these components are characters in their own right, in addition to serving as building-block components.

The background looks like a square of 128 pixels on each side.  In this background:
 Each of about 50 strokes can be drawn in SVG.
 A basic component is composed by calling several strokes. In this component, each stroke is described by its bottom-left and top-right corner. Transformations are possible (reduction, enlargement, etc.). There are more than 1,000 basic components.
 A character is composed by calling several components. In this character, each component is described by its bottom-left and top-right corner. In order for a component to fit into its proper portion of the Chinese character's rectangular block, a component may be transformed (e.g., horizontal or vertical reduction or enlargement) upon its use as a building-block embedded within a containing more-complex character.
Accordingly, a set of less than 50 strokes allow one to construct a set of about 1,000 components which may in turn be embedded within tens of thousands of characters' descriptions. A change in the shape of one of the 50 basic strokes is implicitly applied within each character that embeds that stroke.  Likewise, a change to a component is implicitly applied within each and all characters whose assemblage uses that component.

T. Bishop and R. Cook explain this as follows:

 nearly 100,000 Chinese characters have been described via CDL.

HanGlyph
A character description language intended for supplying missing rare characters in documents (addressing the Chinese equivalent of the gaiji problem).  Documents can contain markup for missing characters, which will automatically trigger the generation of small fonts to provide the characters.  The language itself is a simple postfix notation describing strokes and ways to combine them.  The prototype software uses Metapost to render the characters and embed them in LaTeX documents.  The language was presented by Wai Wong in 1997, and papers about its implementation in Metapost and LaTeX appeared at TeX user group conferences in 2003.

Ideographic Description Sequences

Chapter 12 of the Unicode specification defines a syntax for "Ideographic Description Sequences" (IDSes) intended for use in describing characters not included in the standard in terms of combinations of components that do have code points.  Twelve special characters in the range U+2FF0 to U+2FFB act as prefix operators to combine other characters or sequences to form larger characters.

These sequences are useful in describing to the reader a character that is not directly printable, either because it is absent in a given font, or is absent from the Unicode standard altogether. For example, the Sawndip character "" (encoded in CJK Unified Ideographs Extension F as U+2DA21 𭨡) can be described as "⿰書史". Another use is for dictionary lookup purposes, as a sort of rough input method for queries.

These sequences can be rendered either by keeping the individual characters separately or by parsing the Ideographic Description Sequence and drawing the ideograph so described. They do not, by themselves, provide unambiguous rendering for all characters. For instance, the sequence ⿱十一 represents both 土 ("soil", the middle bar being narrower) and 士 ("bachelor", the middle bar being wider).

Unicode's specification for these sequences is based on the characters and syntax of the earlier GBK standard.

The IDSgrep free software package by Matthew Skala extends Unicode's IDS syntax to include additional features for dictionary lookup; it is capable of converting KanjiVG's database to its own extended IDS format, or of searching EIDS files generated by the related Tsukurimashou font family.

KanjiVG 

KanjiVG (Kanji Vector Graphics) is a free, Creative Commons-licensed Japanese character description language (intended to eventually expand to Chinese as well) based on the SVG vector graphics format.

SCML

In 2007, Structural Character Modeling Language was proposed as a different kind of XML-based Chinese-character description language whose positioning is not based on a numerical grid, as CDL and HanGlyph are.  The known database of characters whose strokes and components are encoded in SCML is for demonstration-of-principle only; no known effort exists to attempt to encode, say, all of Unicode's CJK characters in SCML.

See also
 Unicode
 List of Shuowen Jiezi radicals, a system of 540 components used by Xu Shen (d. ≈147 AD) in his Shuowen Jiezi
 List of Kangxi radicals, a system of 214 components used by the Kangxi dictionary (1716), made under the leadership of the Kangxi Emperor
 List of unicode radicals, a modern and computer-based ongoing attempt to create a complete and accurate set of CJK component list, led by Unicode.
 Cangjie input method

 Radical
 Stroke
 Stroke order

Notes

External links
CDL language from Wenlin Institute
 
 
 
 
2003/12/31 correction: 
 
 
 Digital Humanities Start-up Grant from the U.S. National Endowment for the Humanities

SCML
 

HanGlyph
 
 

Chinese characters
XML